Schnare's Crossing is a community in the Canadian province of Nova Scotia, located in the Lunenburg Municipal District in Lunenburg County.  William A. Gerhardt Property Improvement is located in Schnare's Crossing.

References
Schnare's Crossing on Destination Nova Scotia

Communities in Lunenburg County, Nova Scotia
General Service Areas in Nova Scotia